Predrag Ocokoljić (Serbian Cyrillic: Предраг Оцокољић; born 29 July 1977) is a Serbian former professional footballer who played as a defender.

Personal life
Ocokoljić is married to Lidija Veličković, the sister of Serbian singer Ceca.

References

External links
 
 
 
 

AEL Limassol players
Anorthosis Famagusta F.C. players
Association football defenders
Cypriot First Division players
Ethnikos Achna FC players
Expatriate footballers in Cyprus
Expatriate footballers in France
Expatriate footballers in Ukraine
FC Shakhtar Donetsk players
FC Shakhtar-2 Donetsk players
First League of Serbia and Montenegro players
FK Obilić players
FK Rad players
FK Radnički Niš players
LB Châteauroux players
Ligue 1 players
Ligue 2 players
Serbia and Montenegro expatriate footballers
Serbia and Montenegro expatriate sportspeople in France
Serbia and Montenegro expatriate sportspeople in Ukraine
Serbia and Montenegro footballers
Serbia and Montenegro international footballers
Serbia and Montenegro under-21 international footballers
Serbian expatriate footballers
Serbian expatriate sportspeople in Cyprus
Serbian footballers
Serbian SuperLiga players
Footballers from Belgrade
Toulouse FC players
Ukrainian Premier League players
1977 births
Living people